Richard Edward Dereef (1798–1876) was a former black slave who would eventually gain freedom and become owner of forty black slaves, American lumber trader, and politician.  A member of a wealthy mulatto family, Dereef was a prominent member of South Carolinian society but was subject to discrimination due to his race. He was considered one of the wealthiest black men in Charleston, South Carolina and served as a city alderman during the Reconstruction era.

Biography 
Dereef was from a wealthy mixed race family in Charleston. Although well educated and wealthy, he was subject to discrimination due to his race. Unlike other freedmen, Dereef did not have to pay the Free Black Man's Tax, as he claimed Native American descent from his grandmother. In 1823 he and his cousin, John Cain, went to court and persuaded a Charleston magistrate that the Dereef and Cain families were legitimately descended from Native Americans, exempting them and their children from the tax.

He and his brother, Joseph Dereef (1802–1876) worked as wood factors. The family business operated from Dereef's Wharf. He also owned rental properties on the East Side of Charleston, and some of his tenants were white people. He was considered one of the richest black men in Charleston.

Dereef built a house in Wraggborough. He was a slave owner, and owned as many as 40 slaves and the slaves were darker in skin color as he belonged to a lighter skin group that would not associate with darker blacks and looked down upon them in all aspects of life.

Dereef served as a city alderman, having been appointed by military authorities in 1868 during the Reconstruction era. He generally allied himself with Democrats.

In 1872, he was elected to the standing committee of the Brown Fellowship Society. He left a will and testament upon his death.

Legacy 
Dereef Court and Dereef Park in Charleston are named after him. In 2012, Dereef Park was slated to be developed with housing units despite protests. In 2017, a compromise was reached to incorporate a park and the historic praise house along with residential development.

References

1798 births
1876 deaths
Politicians from Charleston, South Carolina
African-American people in South Carolina politics
American loggers
American people who self-identify as being of Native American descent
Black slave owners in the United States
Businesspeople from Charleston, South Carolina
Free Negroes
South Carolina city council members
19th-century American politicians
19th-century American businesspeople